The 1963 Scotch Cup was the fifth edition of the Scotch Cup and was held from March 13–15 in Perth, Scotland at the Perth Ice Rink. Canada won take out the title after winning five of their six matches with the only loss being against the United States in draw 1.

Teams

Standings

Results

Draw 1

Draw 2

Draw 3

Draw 4

Draw 5

Draw 6

References

External links

Scotch Cup, 1963
World Men's Curling Championship
1963 in Scottish sport
International curling competitions hosted by Scotland
Sport in Perth, Scotland
March 1963 sports events in the United Kingdom